Melaleuca recurva, commonly known as Tinaroo bottlebrush, is a plant in the myrtle family, Myrtaceae and is endemic to higher areas of far northern Queensland in Australia. (Some Australian state herbaria continue to use the name Callistemon recurvus). It is a shrub with spikes of red flowers tipped with yellow in most months of the year and which often has leaves with their edges curled under.

Description
The leaves have indistinct veins and randomly distributed oil glands. The young leaves and branches have fine, silky hairs pressed against their surfaces.

The flowers are bright red tipped with yellow and are arranged in spikes on the ends of branches that continue to grow after flowering, sometimes also in the upper leaf axils.

Taxonomy and naming
Melaleuca recurva was first named in 2006 by Lyndley Craven in Novon when Callistemon recurvus was moved to the present genus. Callistemon recurvus was first formally described in 1990 by Roger David Spencer and Peter Lumley in Muelleria from a specimen collected on Mount Stewart, east of Herberton. The specific epithet (recurva) is a Latin word  meaning "recurved", referring to the leaves often being slightly bent backwards.

Callistemon recurvus is regarded as a synonym of Melaleuca recurva by the Royal Botanic Gardens, Kew.

Distribution and habitat
Melaleuca recurva occurs in the higher districts in Queensland from the Atherton Tableland south to the Bowen district where it grows in dense scrubland and on rocky outcrops near rivers.

Use in horticulture
Melaleuca recurva is often cultivated due to the presence of flowers through most of the year.

References

recurva
Flora of Queensland
Plants described in 1990